Keyway Air Transport was a United States airline that operated from Frankfurt International Airport (which at the time was also home to a United States Air Force facility; Rhein-Main Air Base) using a Boeing T-43 Bobcat (a military variant of the Boeing 737-200) and a Boeing 707-355C. Details on its operation are unknown. The 737-200 was operated by Keyway Air Transport from 1986 up until 1992, when it was transferred to defence contractor EG&G, who operated the aircraft in the Janet fleet up until 2009 when it was retired from service. The Boeing 707-355C was operated from 1986 up until 1989, when it was transferred to HCL Aviation. From 1992 onwards, after having been modified for military service by Raytheon, the aircraft was used by the United States Air Force as an airborne command post for the United States Central Command and later on was reported as being used by the Air Force Special Operations Command, before being put in storage at the 309th Aerospace Maintenance and Regeneration Group located on Davis–Monthan Air Force Base in 2002.

See also 
 List of defunct airlines of the United States

References

Defunct airlines of the United States
Military airlines